Niue competed in the 2010 Commonwealth Games held in Delhi, India, from 3 to 14 October 2010.

Athletics

Men
Track

Boxing

Lawn bowls

Singles

Pairs

Triples

Shooting

Clay Target
Men

Weightlifting

Men

Women

Wrestling

Freestyle

References

Niue
Commonwealth Games
2010